Kelly Gough is an Irish actress, known for her role as Kate Kelly in the RTÉ series Raw. From 2019 to 2020, she appeared in the BBC medical drama Casualty as Violette Spark.

Career
Gough's first professional acting role was with the Yew Tree Theatre production of  Falling out of Love, written by John Breen and directed by Mikel Murfi. She has subsequently appeared in productions including Big Love for the Abbey Theatre, The Playboy of the Western World for the Druid Theatre Company, All in the Timing for Inis Theatre and Extremities for Spark to a Flame. Later theatre work includes Lady Macbeth in Macbeth directed by David Horan, Elizabeth in Don Carlos directed by Gadi Roll, and Blanche in A Streetcar named Desire directed by Chelsea Walker, in what The Times described as "a name-making performance".

Gough's extensive television credits include season 3 of Marcella for ITV and Netflix, Shadow and Bone, Strike Back, Call the Midwife, Broadchurch, The Fall, Vera, the Irish language series Scúp (for which she was nominated for the Actor of the Year Award at the Oireachtas Irish language media awards) The Clinic, This is Nightlive, and Raw. She has also appeared in the feature-length films Kill Command and Out of Innocence. Short film credits include Cry Rosa and Taking Stock, for which she was nominated Best Actor in a Female Role at the Richard Harris International Film Festival. From 2019 to 2020, she appeared in the BBC medical drama series Casualty as Violette Spark, the sister of established character Ruby Spark (Maddy Hill). Also in 2020, Gough starred as Stacey in the third series of Nordic noir detective series Marcella.

Personal life
She is the younger sister of actress Denise Gough and she has an identical twin sister Ciara.

References

External links
 
 

Year of birth missing (living people)
Alumni of Trinity College Dublin
Irish stage actresses
Irish television actresses
Living people
People from Ennis